Dion Enrico Pereira (born 25 March 1999) is an English footballer who plays as a winger for Bradford City on loan from Luton Town.

Club career
On 6 May 2017, Pereira made his senior debut for Watford in a 3–0 away defeat at Leicester City, coming on as a substitute in the 83rd minute for Mbaye Niang.

Pereira was awarded the Watford Young Player of the Season award for the 2016–17 season.

On 15 January 2019, Pereira signed with MLS club Atlanta United. He later joined the club's affiliate side Atlanta United 2 and on 10 March 2019, made his debut for the side in the USL Championship in 2–0 win over Hartford Athletic.

Pereira was released by Atlanta before the start of their 2020 season.

On 3 November 2020, Pereira signed with Luton Town and joined the U23 team after 11 months without football.

On 8 October 2021, Pereira joined National League side Yeovil Town on a short-term loan deal. Pereira's loan with Yeovil Town was cut short after just one match after being recalled by Luton.

On 4 January 2022, Pereira joined League Two side Bradford City on loan until the end of the season. The move was assisted by Pereira's Luton teammate Carlos Mendes Gomes, who had been managed by Bradford City manager Derek Adams at Morecambe. On 1 September 2022, Pereira returned to Bradford City on loan until the end of the 2022–23 season.

Personal life
Born in England, Pereira is of Portuguese descent. Went to Queens secondary school in Bushey and left in 2015.

Career statistics

References

External links
Dion Pereira profile  at the official Watford F.C. website

1999 births
Living people
Sportspeople from Watford
English footballers
Association football wingers
Watford F.C. players
Atlanta United FC players
Atlanta United 2 players
Luton Town F.C. players
Yeovil Town F.C. players
Bradford City A.F.C. players
Premier League players
USL League Two players
USL Championship players
English Football League players
National League (English football) players
Major League Soccer players
English expatriate footballers
Expatriate soccer players in the United States
English expatriate sportspeople in the United States
English people of Portuguese descent